Consejo Coordinador de Seguridad Pública, commonly known as La Oficina (lit. "The Office"), was a Chilean civilian intelligence organisation that operated from 1991 to 1993. It was created by the government of Patricio Aylwin on April 26, 1991, following the assesination of Jaime Guzmán on April 1 the same year. La Oficina repressed violent left-wing organisations that posed a treat to the Chilean transition to democracy. The leadership of La Oficina was made of politicians of the Socialist Party and the Christian Democratic Party. It has been accused that the organisation used methods similar to those used by the preceding military dictatorship of Pinochet including torture. La Oficina worked with a network of informants and promoted a culture of squealing in the targeted organisations. Informants linked to the targeted organisations were urged to give up armed resistance, hand over firearms and their brother-in-arms. They were also promised regular jobs if they provided useful information. 

The groups targeted by La Oficina were:
Manuel Rodríguez Patriotic Front (FPMR), originally the paramilitary arm of the Communist Party, but by the 1990s an independent organisation.
Lautaro Youth Movement (MAPU Lautaro), a splinter group of Popular Unitary Action Movement that believed in insurrection against the military dictatorship and the civilian governments that succeeding it by seeking compromises. 
Revolutionary Left Movement (MIR)

References

1991 establishments in Chile
1993 disestablishments in Chile
Defunct Chilean intelligence agencies
Presidency of Patricio Aylwin